Flanders is a hamlet and a census-designated place (CDP) in Suffolk County, New York, United States. The population was 4,472 at the 2010 census. It is the location of the Big Duck.

It is located in the town of Southampton on the south side of the Peconic River at its mouth in Peconic Bay. Riverhead is across the river to the north.

Geography
Flanders is located at  (40.905086, -72.611717).

Demographics of the CDP
As of the census of 2010, there were 4,705 people, 1,797 households, and 1,068 families residing in the CDP. The population density was 297.1 per square mile (114.7/km2). There were 1,797 housing units at an average density of 124.0/sq mi (47.9/km2). The racial makeup of the CDP was 25.63% White, 21.12% African American, 8.05% Native American, 1.04% Asian, 2.08% from other races, and 12.06% from two or more races. Hispanic or Latino of any race were 42.08% of the population.

There were 652 households that had children under the age of 18 living with them, 47.5% were married couples living together, 16.4% had a female householder with no husband present, and 29.4% were non-families. 21.5% of all households were made up of individuals, and 7.0% had someone living alone who was 65 years of age or older. The average household size was 3.28 and the average family size was 3.41.

In the CDP, the population was spread out, with 19% under the age of 18, 5.6% from 18 to 24, 52.7% from 15 to 44, 20.9% from 45 to 64, and 6,8% who were 65 years of age or older. The median age was 36.1 years. For every 100 females, there were 149.2 males.

The median income for a household in the CDP was $82,868, and the median income for a family was $69,615. Males had a median income of $46,844 versus $34,833 for females. The per capita income for the CDP was $26,274. About 15.7% of families and 16.2% of the population were below the poverty line, including 16.9% of those under age 18 and none of those age 65 or over.

References

External links

Flanders, New York flag (Flags of the World)

Southampton (town), New York
Census-designated places in New York (state)
Hamlets in New York (state)
Census-designated places in Suffolk County, New York
Hamlets in Suffolk County, New York
Populated coastal places in New York (state)